Fred A. Precht (1863–1942) was a painter of portraits and interior scenes.

Life 
Precht was born in Germany on November 29, 1863 and immigrated to the United States in 1880, at age 16.  He lived and worked in New York City, exhibiting in the Society of Independent Artists, the National Academy of Design and the Pennsylvania Academy of the Fine Arts between 1917 and 1930. He died in 1942.

References
 Falk, Peter Hastings, Who was Who in American Art, 1564-1975, Madison, CT, Sound View Press, 1999, Vol. III, p. 2657.
 Jacobsen, Anita, Jacobsen's Biographical Index of American Artists, Dallas, Texas, A. J. Publications, 2002, Vol. I, Book III, p. 2592.
  National Collection of Fine Arts (U.S.), Pennsylvania Academy Moderns, 1910-1940, Washington, Smithsonian Institution Press, 1975, p. 40.

External links

 Art Inventories Catalog, Smithsonian American Art Museum
 Fred A. Precht in AskART

Footnotes

20th-century American painters
American male painters
Artists from New York (state)
1863 births
1942 deaths
20th-century American male artists